Julio Junior Bórquez Hernández (born 20 April 2000), also known as Junior Bórquez, is a Chilean footballer who plays as a goalkeeper for Chilean Tercera A side Lota Schwager.

Club career
A product of Deportes Iquique, in 2021 he played for Chilean Segunda División side Deportes Colina. In 2022 he moved to Tercera A side Lota Schwager.

Controversies
On April, 2020, he was suspended from the football activity, along with his teammate Luis Sotomayor, due to doping by furosemide, a substance found in a sample taken on February, 2020. After this situation, Deportes Iquique released him on January, 2021.

International career
He has represented Chile U17 in a friendly match against USA U17, at the 2017 South American U-17 Championship – Chile was the runner-up – and at the 2017 FIFA U-17 World Cup. Also, he played all the matches for Chile U17 at the friendly tournament Lafarge Foot Avenir 2017 in France, better known as Tournament Limoges, where Chile became champion after defeating Belgium U18 and Poland U18 and drawing France U18.
 
He was in the Chile U20 squad for both the 2019 South American U-20 Championship and the 2018 South American Games, winning the gold medal,

Honours

International
Chile U17
Tournoi de Limoges: 2017

Chile U20
 South American Games Gold medal: 2018

References

External links
 

2000 births
Living people
People from Iquique
Chilean footballers
Chile youth international footballers
Chile under-20 international footballers
Chilean Primera División players
Segunda División Profesional de Chile players
Deportes Iquique footballers
Deportes Colina footballers
Lota Schwager footballers
Association football goalkeepers
Association football forwards
South American Games gold medalists for Chile
South American Games medalists in football
Competitors at the 2018 South American Games